The 1873 Ohio gubernatorial election was held on October 8, 1873. Democratic nominee William Allen defeated incumbent Republican Edward Follansbee Noyes with 47.82% of the vote.

General election

Candidates
Major party candidates
William Allen, Democratic
Edward Follansbee Noyes, Republican 

Other candidates
Gideon T. Stewart, Prohibition
Isaac C. Collins, Independent

Results

References

1873
Ohio